The 451st Expeditionary Sustainment Command (ESC) is a subordinate command of 79th Sustainment Support Command.

History 
The Army Reserve officially placed the 451st ESC in a two-year "carrier status" to allow the Army Reserve the necessary time to recruit soldiers, equip the unit and begin training to meet its activation date.
Located in Wichita, Kansas the 451st ESC activated on 16 September 2011, becoming the newest ESC in the Army Reserve. In October 2012, the 451st took command and control of multiple Army Reserve units throughout the Midwest. The unit deployed to the CENTCOM area of responsibility in support of contingency operations in 2016.

Subordinate Units
As of 2022 the following units are subordinated to the 451st Sustainment Command (Expeditionary):

 451st Sustainment Command (Expeditionary), in Wichita, Kansas
 89th Sustainment Brigade, in Kansas City, Missouri
 329th Combat Sustainment Support Battalion
 484th Transportation Battalion
 620th Combat Sustainment Support Battalion
 561st Regional Support Group, in Elkhorn, Nebraska
 394th Combat Sustainment Support Battalion
 450th Transportation Battalion
 821st Transportation Battalion

References

External links 

  451 Sustainment Command (Expeditionary) Home Page
 U.S. Army Reserve to Begin Building New Unit in Wichita, Kansas
 Wichita Biz Journal: New Army Reserve unit coming to Wichita

Military units and formations of the United States Army Reserve
451
Military units and formations established in 2011